PocketStudio by Winsoft is an IDE supporting rapid application development (RAD) for Palm OS and related operating systems such as Garnet OS or Access Linux Platform. In some regard similar to Delphi and Lazarus, it has a visual form designer, an object inspector and a source code editor.

Distinguishing features
PocketStudio's programming language is a subset of Pascal that has been adapted to the needs of Palm OS development. The compiler generates native code targeting the Motorola MC68000 family microprocessor.

For debugging, the Palm OS emulator POSE is embedded. As an alternative, the Garnet OS simulator can be used. PocketStudio integrates wireless development including Bluetooth technologies. Other features are a project manager, code templates, inline assembler support and code examples.

The IDE runs on Windows and generates PRC files for being transferred to handhelds via HotSync or for distribution via internet or storage media.

Supporting third party libraries
 
Several APIs support development with PocketStudio via special libraries. Examples are:
 ASE.PalmLibrary, a multi-purpose library
 ASTA SkyWire (see below)
 Cephes, a collection of mathematical routines for scientific and engineering applications
 MathLib, shared library of IEEE-754 double math functions
 VoiceIt voice recognition software
 XPrint System Library, a shared library that enables printing support in applications

Applications produced with PocketStudio
ASTA SkyWire Client for Palm OS, a cross platform wireless toolkit with PocketStudio interface libraries.
SPINA is a medical cybernetic software package that allows for calculating constant structure parameters of endocrine feedback control systems from hormone levels obtained in vivo. This free software comes with source code in Lazarus/FPC and PocketStudio.
SITKPalm, a System Information Tool Kit for Palm OS.

External links 
winsoft
winsoft news server with several groups on PocketStudio
PocketStudio developers forum
Jim Cooper: Introduction to PalmOS Programming

Palm OS software
Integrated development environments
Pascal (programming language) compilers
Pascal programming language family